Ronald William Rex Hunt (25 December 1897 – 7 June 1968) was an Australian politician. He was the Liberal and Country League member for Victoria in the South Australian House of Assembly from 1933 to 1938.

References

 

1897 births
1968 deaths
Liberal and Country League politicians
Members of the South Australian House of Assembly
Place of birth missing
20th-century Australian politicians